Aethiophysa savoralis is a moth in the family Crambidae. It was described by Schaus in 1920. It is found in Cuba and Puerto Rico.

References

Glaphyriinae
Moths described in 1920
Moths of the Caribbean